New South Wales Lotteries, (usually marketed and referred to as NSW Lotteries or the Lott) is a corporation owned by the Government of New South Wales in Australia.  Since 2 March 2010, it has been operated by Tatts Group Limited under a 40-year exclusive licence. It runs games of chance through a network of agents, most of which are newsagencies. It falls under the government portfolio of Gaming and Racing and is governed by the Public Lotteries Act 1996.

Divisions
On 1 June 2016 the NSW Lotteries brand became one of the four Tatts Group jurisdictional brands to be incorporated into a national lottery brand called ‘the Lott’. The other brands being Tatts Lottery, Golden Casket and South Australian Lotteries.

NSW Lotteries runs some of its lotteries itself and syndicates a number of others run by interstate lottery organisations. The lotteries offered are:
 Lotto
 There are three Lotto draws weekly, occurring on Monday, Wednesday and Saturday evenings. Although the three are marketed identically by NSW Lotteries, the Saturday Lotto draw is a national lottery run by Tatts Group Limited and syndicated by NSW Lotteries. It is known elsewhere in Australia as Tattslotto or Gold Lotto. The Monday & Wednesday Lotto draws are run by NSW Lotteries and are available across Australia except Queensland. Although the draws are played identically, all requiring players to select six numbers from a possible 45, Saturday Lotto/Tattslotto is more expensive to enter due to its larger prize pool. 
 Lotto Strike
 Lucky Lotteries 
 The 'Lucky Lotteries' brand is used to market the $2 Jackpot Lottery and the $5 Jackpot Lottery, which are separate although similar games.
 Oz Lotto (run by Tatts Group and syndicated by NSW Lotteries)
 Powerball (run by Tatts Group and syndicated by NSW Lotteries)
 Set For Life is a new NSW Lotteries game launched on 3 August 2015.

NSW Lotteries also sells various scratchcard games, under the brand 'Instant Scratch-its'.

See also

Lotteries in Australia

References

External links
NSW Lotteries
the Lott

Lotteries
Lotteries in Australia
1930 establishments in Australia
Government agencies established in 1930